Dabrava is a village in Lovech Municipality, Lovech Province, northern Bulgaria.

Dabrava Glacier on Graham Land, Antarctica is named after the village.

References

Villages in Lovech Province